Iwona Filipowicz (born 4 January 1976) is a Polish former competitive ice dancer. With partner Michał Szumski, she is the 1995 World Junior bronze medalist. They won gold medals at the 1995 Karl Schäfer Memorial, 1996 Golden Spin of Zagreb, and 1995 Grand Prix International St. Gervais, as well as silver at the 1995 Nebelhorn Trophy and two bronze medals at the Finlandia Trophy.

Programs 
(with Szumski)

Competitive highlights 
(with Szumski)

References 

1976 births
Polish female ice dancers
Living people
World Junior Figure Skating Championships medalists
Sportspeople from Łódź